In the aftermath of the 2010 election, great attention was given to the decision on who should be the next Iraqi PM. Both al-Iraqiyya's Allawi and the State of Law coalition's al-Maliki laid claim to the post, so it was seen as up to the Kurdish parties and the Iraqi National Alliance to decide this matter.

One of the two main components of the INA, the Supreme Iraqi Islamic Council, stated it would not join any government that did not include former PM Allawi; the other main component, the Sadrist Movement, held an unofficial referendum on 2 and 3 April 2010 on who should be PM. The possible choices were Allawi, al-Maliki, former PM Ibrahim al-Jaafari, Adel Abdel Mahdi from the SIIC, and Jaafar al-Sadr (a little-known MP from al-Maliki's Dawa Party, son of its ideological founder Mohammad Baqir al-Sadr). On 7 April 2010, results were announced, according to which al-Jaafari had won with 24% of the vote. Jaafari had originally been a member of al-Maliki's Dawa Party, but had left it in 2008 to found his own party, the National Reform Trend, as whose lone MP he was elected in this election.

The full results of the 1.43 million ballots cast in the unofficial Sadrist referendum were as follows:

Background 
After months of negotiations the National Iraqi Alliance and the State of Law Coalition agreed to merging into one parliamentary bloc of 159 seats, the bloc would be 4 seats short of a majority but would have the right for government formation. However the bloc has to date still not appointed a prime ministerial candidate. The bloc, called the National Alliance, was formally formed on 11 June 2010. The new parliament opened on 14 June 2010. However, talks between the National Iraqi Alliance and al-Iraqiyya continued. On 3 September 2010 the National Iraqi Alliance nominated Adil Abdul-Mahdi as the coalition's nominee for Prime Minister, making it unclear which candidate the National Alliance bloc would ultimately choose.

The President of Iraqi Kurdistan Massoud Barzani announced the four major Kurdish lists: the Kurdistani List, the Gorran List, the Kurdistan Islamic Union and the Islamic Group of Kurdistan agreed to merging into one parliamentary bloc of 57 seats, called the Coalition of Kurdistan Lists or Kurdistan Blocs Coalition (KBC). On 30 October, however the Nawshirwan Mustafa's Gorran Movement (announced their withdrawal from the KBC due to a dispute between Gorran and the ruling KDP-PUK coalition in the Kurdistan Autonomous Republic. This reduced the bloc to 49 seats
In August the KBC announced 19 demands which would have to be agreed upon by al-Maliki or Allawi for them to join their government. The Islamic Supreme Council of Iraq then agreed to all 19 demands. Incumbent Prime Minister Nouri al-Maliki agreed to 18 out of 19 demands (including implementation of article 140), only disagreeing with the demand that the government were to resign if the Kurdistan Alliance withdraws. Al-Iraqiya, however, rejected 9 of the Kurdish demands, including the demands for a Kurdish presidency, Iraqi government funding of the Peshmerga and for the implementation of article 140 of the Iraqi constitution.

Incumbent Prime Minister Nuri al-Maliki also visited Iran amid drawn out coalition talks. The trip came amid reports from the Los Angeles Times and the Guardian that Iran had been directly involved trying to bring about a Shia coalition by convincing Muqtada al-Sadr to back an al-Maliki-led government, and thus increase Iran's influence in Iraq against those supported by the West. Iyad Allawi's bloc, which won a plurality, would then be sidelined. As such Allawi claimed to CNN that Iran was "trying to wreak havoc on the region, [by] trying to destabilise the region by destabilising Iraq, and destabilising Lebanon and destabilising the Palestinian issue. This is where unfortunately Iraq and the rest of the greater Mideast is falling victim to these terrorists who are definitely Iran-financed and supported by various governments in the region." His deputy was also alleged to have said "Iranian involvement amounts to a takeover of Iraq." While the West expressed worry about Iran's growing influence and potential influence in Iraq, Iran's Supreme Leader Ayatollah Ali Khamenei said, in responding to al-Maliki description that mutual relations were strategic and amicable, "Despite relative stability in Iraq, the country is still suffering from insecurity and part of this insecurity is resulted from the pressures that are exerted by some powers whose political interests lie in creating insecurity in Iraq." Following his visit to Iran, al-Maliki also visited Syria, Jordan and Egypt, where he said a new government could be imminent as "discussions are taking place, we are now at the end of the tunnel, at the end of the road. If God allows, this government will emerge soon." A few days later, Iranian President Mahmoud Ahmadinejad talked to his Iraqi counterpart Jalal Talabani and said he "hope[s] that with the formation of a new Iraqi government, bilateral ties will expand in different areas, especially in the economic and political fields."

Saudi Arabia also offered to host an all-party conference in November to break the deadlock in government formation. However, al-Maliki's bloc turned down the proposal amid concerns over foreign interference. The National Alliance issued a statement saying: "Though we express our appreciation to Saudi Arabia for its concern about the situation in Iraq and its willingness to provide support, we would like to confirm Iraqi leaders are continuing their meetings to reach a national consensus." a statement issued by the alliance, said. The Kurdish Alliance also reportedly supported the statement. While Iraqiya welcomed the Saudi initiative. "We ask all political blocs to welcome the initiative, preventing Iraq's security situation from deteriorating." The United States also called for an "inclusive government." It said that Allawi and others from Iraqiya, as well as all the "winning blocs" should hold "leadership posts" in a new government.

In early October, the National Alliance (consisting of State of Law and the NIA) nominated Nouri al-Maliki as their Prime Minister candidate after Muqtada al-Sadr and al-Maliki struck a deal together. This however led to a split within the National Alliance (159 seats) as the ISCI-bloc (which including Badr and Hezbollah holds 19 seats), the Islamic Fadhila Party (6 seats) and the Gathering of Justice and Unity (1 seat) left the alliance to create an alliance with Ayad Allawi's al-Iraqiyya (91 seats). The Iraqiyya led bloc nominated prominent ISCI politician and at the time Vice-President Adil Abd al-Mahdi as Prime Minister. Meanwhile, the two minor Sunni blocs, Unity Alliance of Iraq and the Iraqi Accord Front merged into one 10-seat bloc, called the Center Current, which entered into negotiations with both major blocs for coalition partnerships. However, both blocs needed the support of Kurdish parties to gain a parliamentary majority, this support was eventually given to al-Maliki's bloc after he agreed to all 19 Kurdish demands, which led to the re-uniting of the National Alliance.

On 24 October, the Supreme Court of Iraq ordered the parliament to reconvene and elect a new speaker. The court ordered a parliamentary speaker to be chosen on 8 November The day before the vote for parliamentary speaker, a power-sharing accord was agreed to that would allow al-Maliki to continues as PM. As talks to form a new government reached a climax al-Maliki and Allawi were scheduled to attend a ceremony in Arbil, the capital of the autonomous region of Kurdistan, to make a formal announcement in regards to the agreement. Iraqiya MP Jamal al-Butikh then said an agreement was reached after assurances that "no political decision would be made without its agreement." At one point, Iraqiya staged a walkout after al-Nujaifi declined a request to vote on the removal of three parliament members' names because of affiliation to the deposed Saddam Hussein's Ba'ath Party. They later said the walkout was a misunderstanding.

During the parliamentary session on 11 November, Osama al-Nujaifi, a Sunni Arab from Iraqiya's al-Hadba Party was elected to be parliamentary speaker, with prominent Sadrist leader Qusay al-Suhail chosen as his first deputy and Arif Tayfur (a leading member of Massoud Barzani's Kurdistan Democratic Party) was re-elected to the post of second deputy speaker. Patriotic Union of Kurdistan leader Jalal Talabani was re-elected as President, al-Maliki was re-elected as prime minister and Allawi had reportedly agreed to head a new security council. Massoud Barzani, the president of Kurdistan region said that it was a great victory for the Iraqi people, which came at a late stage. A third session of the new parliament on 21 November still did not come to an agreement on who would run the new government.

New parliamentary blocs
During the government formation process numerous lists fused together to form larger parliamentary blocs.

New government

On December 22, parliament unanimously approved al-Maliki's new government. Twenty-nine ministers were approved, including Shias, Sunnis and Kurds. In reaction, al-Maliki issued his new government's programme and also vowed to make Iraq a "truly democratic state that respects human rights." However, he criticised the lack of any female nominees and warned that "given the circumstances it has been created under, this government does not satisfy the people nor the needs of our country. The effort and the will to make it work in the best possible way it can is there."

In the new government al-Maliki became acting Minister of Defence, Interior, and National Security. Thus, essentially giving al-Maliki full control of the military. These positions were meant to be temporary until appropriate candidates could be found, however al-Maliki remained in them until the end of his term. Former Oil Minister Hussein Shahristani would become Deputy Prime Minister for Energy. The former Deputy Prime Minister Rafi al-Issawi would become Finance Minister. Foreign Minister Hoshyar Zebari will continue in his post. Saleh al-Mutlaq was also controversially appointed a Deputy Prime Minister after a ban on him taking part in politics as a former Ba'athist. Thirteen more ministerial posts had acting ministers as al-Maliki said "The formation of national unity government in Iraq is a difficult and hard task because we need to find place in the government for all those who participated and won in the elections."

Repercussions
Following the formation of a government and his blocs strong showing Muqtada al-Sadr returned to Najaf from exile in Iran in early January 2011.

Aftermath
In July 2011 al-Maliki agreed to cut 12 ministries from his cabinet, which was a compromise from his original proposal to cut 16 ministerial portfolios. The agreement comes amid debate over whether or not a US military contingent would remain beyond a 31 December 2011 deadline for their withdrawal.

References

External links
 'Go to Tehran': The inside story of how the US was sidelined in Iraq by David Hearst

Government of Iraq
Iraqi government formation 2010
Government formation
Iraqi government formation